Irvin William Hach (1873–1936) was a Major League Baseball second baseman and third baseman. He played for the 1897 Louisville Colonels.

Sources

Major League Baseball second basemen
Major League Baseball third basemen
Louisville Colonels players
Baseball players from Kentucky
1873 births
1936 deaths
19th-century baseball players
Paterson Silk Weavers players
Atlanta Crackers players
Oswego Grays players
Ottumwa Giants players